Mitchell Street may mean:

 Mitchell Street, a street containing the Hotel Row historic district in Atlanta, Georgia
 Mitchell Street, a neighborhood of Milwaukee, Wisconsin